Michael Toner may refer to:

Michael E. Toner, American lawyer and political appointee
Michael Toner (journalist) (born 1944), British journalist and writer
Mike Toner, American journalist